The Wolane people are an ethnic group in southern Ethiopia. Wolane people speak a Semitic language which is closely related to Sil'te, Zay and Harari languages. One of the Wolane peoples ancestor was Kabir Hamid who arrived from Harar. Wolane’s territory was annexed into Gurage after Menelik's forces invaded in the 1800's. Wolane domain today remains under the Gurage zone's eastern most district, however there has been calls by the Wolane to push for a separate Wolane region.

Wolane Community 

The Wolane community consists of 160,000 people. A remarkable number of Wolane is living in Addis Ababa. The Wolane in the countryside live mostly in higher places, called "Däga". These places are very suitable for the cultivation of Enset, which is one of Wolane people stample foods.

References

Bibliography 
 Crass, J. & Meyer, R. (2001). The Qabena and the Wolane: Two people of the Gurage Region and their Respective Histories according to their Own Oral Tradition.

Ethnic groups in Ethiopia